DJ Chef, also known as Chefal, is a dubstep DJ from South London. XLR8R has called him "One of U.K. pirate radio’s biggest dubstep DJs". He is an employee of Transition Mastering Studio, which XLR8R called "dubstep’s most renowned acetate-cutting studio." In 2010 Chef, Plastician and P Money represented for London on the BBC Dubstep Soundclash and won.

Chefal has been hosting a weekly Radio Show on London's Rinse FM for the last eight years.

References

External links 
 DJChefal.co.uk – Official website

People from Croydon
English electronic musicians
Dubstep musicians
Living people
English DJs
English record producers
English people of Sierra Leonean descent
Electronic dance music DJs
Year of birth missing (living people)